Ignazio Balsamo (25 October 1912 – 7 August 1994) was an Italian film and stage actor.

Life and career 
Born in Catania, Balsamo began his career on stage, being part of several Sicilian language theatrical companies. Discovered by Pietro Germi, who offered him a role of weight in the film In the Name of the Law, following the success of the film  Balsamo moved to Rome where he had a long film career as a character actor, mainly cast in roles of Sicilian criminals and villains. He also worked as a production coordinator  and a production runner for the companies Fortunia Film and Romana Film. Balsamo was also author of two plays in Sicilian language, Casa Cantoniera and Tila di ragnu.

Selected filmography 

 In the Name of the Law (1949) - Francesco Messana
 Outlaw Girl (1950) - Ciro Sollima
 The Fighting Men (1950) - Antonio Schepisi
 Il caimano del Piave (1951) - Sergente siciliano al fronte
 Behind Closed Shutters (1951) - Minor Role (uncredited)
 Tragic Serenade (1951)
 La vendetta di una pazza (1951)
 Anna (1951) - Un agente di pubblica sicurezza (uncredited)
 What Price Innocence? (1952) - Giovanni
 Ergastolo (1952)
 Girls Marked Danger (1952) - Il Francese
 I tre corsari (1952) - Van Stiller
 Jolanda, the Daughter of the Black Corsair (1952) - Van Stiller
 La carovana del peccato (1953)
 Addio, figlio mio! (1953) - Martinelli
 Neapolitan Turk (1953) - Luigi
 La lupa (1953) - Don Antonio, Imbornone's Secretary
 The Ship of Condemned Women (1953) - Duràn
 Genoese Dragnet (1954) - Giovanni Feruglio
 Letter from Naples (1954) - The Police Commissioner
 Cuore di mamma (1954) - Biagio Carrino
 Acque amare (1954) - Police Commissioner
 It Happened at the Police Station (1954) - Taxi driver
 La Luciana (1954)
 Buonanotte... avvocato! (1955) - Commissar
 The White Angel (1955) - Un poliziotto
 Suonno d'ammore (1955) - Arturo, Padre di Maria
 La rossa (1955) - Un brigadiere dei carabinieri
 Accadde al penitenziario (1955) - Detenuto mafioso
 La moglie è uguale per tutti (1955) - The Sicilian Passenger on Bus
 Una sera di maggio (1955)
 Andalusia Express (1956) - Rubio
 Arrivano i dollari! (1957) - Ernesto
 Cavalier in Devil's Castle (1959)
 Policarpo (1959) - Poliziotto (uncredited)
 The Magistrate (1959) - The Sea Captain
 The Pirate and the Slave Girl (1959)
 The Giant of Marathon (1959) - Ship's Captain
 Ferdinando I re di Napoli (1959) - The Jailer
 I baccanali di Tiberio (1960)
 La Dolce Vita (1960) - (uncredited)
 Un militare e mezzo (1960) - Porter
 Knight of 100 Faces (1960) - Aiutante di Fosco
 Le bal des espions (1960)
 Pirates of the Coast (1960) - Brook
 Rapina al quartiere Ovest (1960)
 Robin Hood e i pirati (1960)
 Un dollaro di fifa (1960) - Poker Player
 Garibaldi (1961) - Colonel Pallavicino
 L'onorata società (1961)
 The Secret of the Black Falcon (1961) - Sancho
 Don Camillo: Monsignor (1961) - Un compagno socialista (uncredited)
 Queen of the Seas (1961) - Captain of the Guard
 The Vengeance of Ursus (1961) - Andros
 The Italian Brigands (1961) - Scannamorti
 Duello nella sila (1962)
 Odio mortale (1962) - Herrera
 Gli eroi del doppio gioco (1962) - Partisan
 Zorro and the Three Musketeers (1963)
 The Eye of the Needle (1962) - Father of Nicola
 L'invincibile cavaliere mascherato (1963) - Primo Cittadino appestato
 Samson and the Slave Queen (1963) - Joaquim
 Hercules and the Masked Rider (1963)
 Una spada nell'ombra (1963) - Zingano
 Hercules and the Black Pirates (1964)
 Hercules Against Rome (1964) - Tauras
 Terror in the Crypt (1964) - (uncredited)
 Hercules and the Treasure of the Incas (1964) - Sergeant (uncredited)
 Goliath at the Conquest of Damascus (1965) - Messenger
 Giant of the Evil Island (1965) - Navarro
 How We Robbed the Bank of Italy (1966) - Fake Nurse
 Zorro il ribelle (1966) - Salvador
 Shoot Loud, Louder... I Don't Understand (1966)
 La notte dell'addio (1966)
 7 monaci d'oro (1966) - Brigadiere (uncredited)
 Danger!! Death Ray (1967) - Henchman 'X2' (uncredited)
 Il magnifico Texano (1967) - Stark Henchman (uncredited)
 2 RRRingos no Texas (1967) - Poker player
 Non mi dire mai good-bye (1967)
 Delitto a Posillipo - Londra chiama Napoli (1967) - Rosario (uncredited)
 Due occhi per uccidere (1968)
 I 2 pompieri (1968)
 I 2 deputati (1968) - PCI member
 Zorro in the Court of England (1969) - Dice gambler
 Il ragazzo che sorride (1969) - Assistant of engineer
 Indovina chi viene a merenda? (1969) - Cook (uncredited)
 Zorro, the Navarra Marquis (1969) - Apothecary
 I 2 magnifici fresconi (1969) - don Mimì Cannaruta
 Franco, Ciccio e il pirata Barbanera (1969)
 Poppea's Hot Nights (1969)
 Satiricosissimo (1970) - Pedlar (uncredited)
 Ma chi t'ha dato la patente? (1970)
 W le donne (1970) - Marshal Palombi
 Principe coronato cercasi per ricca ereditiera (1970) - Creditor (uncredited)
 Mezzanotte d'amore (1970) - Prison Guard
 I due maggiolini più matti del mondo (1970)
 Due bianchi nell'Africa nera (1970)
 I due maghi del pallone (1970) - Manager of Ghiandineddese
 Zorro il cavaliere della vendetta (1971) - (final film role)

References

External links 
 

1912 births
1994 deaths
Italian male film actors
Italian male stage actors
Actors from Catania
20th-century Italian male actors